FK Sūduva is a Lithuanian professional football club based in the city of Marijampolė. Founded in 1968, the club competes in the A Lyga, the top flight of Lithuanian football.

The club has been playing in the A Lyga since 2002. In 2006, the club won its first trophy – the Lithuanian Cup, a feat they repeated in 2009. In 2017, Sūduva won the A Lyga for the first time in its history, and repeated the triumph in 2018 and 2019.

The team's colours are white and red. The club plays at Marijampolė Arena in Marijampolė (capacity 6,250).

Name history
1968 – Sūduva Kapsukas (from Suvalkija, a cultural region of Lithuania, and Kapsukas, former name of the city of Marijampolė)
1993 – Sūduva-Žydrius (after the Žydrius automotive parts company)
1994 – Sūduva Marijampolė

History

Soviet times
Sūduva is one of the oldest and still functioning clubs in Lithuania. It is not so easy to trace its history, as in Soviet times it often changed names with every new owner that supported it. It is more or less agreed that officially this club has existed under the name of Sūduva since 1968. This date (1968) known, because officially was founded Sūduva as football club.

During Soviet times it drifted between different local leagues, producing few footballers for the above-mentioned Žalgiris and slowly building a local football community. Football was also actively played in a few smaller towns around Marijampolė, thus making the community of football lovers even stronger. Actually, it was stronger than the club itself, and those who follow the team today are adding to the old tradition.

The biggest achievement of the club during Soviet times came in 1975 when Sūduva reached 3rd place at the local top division. The next year it played and lost the National Cup Final.

1990–2001
After the dissolution of the Soviet Union Sūduva got few chances to go up. It played the only Baltic championship in 1990 with teams from Lithuania, Latvia, and Estonia. Next year it tried the Lithuanian top division. Both efforts were terrible – Sūduva finished both championships as the last team collecting 7 points at the Baltic championship and only 2 at the Lithuanian league.

Later the team navigated between the 2nd and the 3rd divisions for some 10 years without decent funds or a truly professional attitude. The worst was the season of 1998 / 1999. The team started well at the 2nd division but left it after half a season because it had no funds. It was not the end. The football traditions were too strong.

The team recovered next season at the 3rd division, won it the following year, went up and won again. This rise continues up to this day.

2002–present
The season of 2002 shaped the future. The team reached the top division. It also reached the finals of the National Cup and gained the chance to take part in the UEFA Cup. But the most important thing was that it also got new owners who were determined to create a normally functioning and financially predictable club. The European campaign of that year added some good emotions to the general hype.

The semi-professional team vanquished Brann from Norway during its first European match (3–2 both away and at home) and went to Glasgow to meet Celtic. This match was not so successful (actually, the result is still featured in the statistics of Celtic as one of the biggest victories in Europe).

Three more seasons at the middle of the table and the team reached 3rd place – 30 years after the achievement of the same caliber. Repeating that history, the club reached the finals of the National Cup the following year. Only this time the Cup went to Marijampolė.

Since that year Sūduva have been one of the most stable clubs of the country – both financially and on the league table. It reached 2nd position twice (2007 and 2010), 3rd position – three times (2009, 2011 and 2012) and won the National Cup one more time (2008). It went to play European cups every year receiving teams like Rapid, Red Bull and Club Brugge.

The year 2013 saw a new concept of the team. The budget was still stable but it went down. So the team expressed the wish to put more stress on integration of young local boys into the main team. Some important players of the earlier seasons left; a few foreign players came to stand along those who left and the new blood.

So that was the year of experiments. The team was much younger, less experienced and clearly weaker. It was many seasons before Sūduva was a clear member of 2–4 teams that were clear leaders of the championship. The question was only about what kind of medals each team would get. That year the situation was much tougher for Sūduva. It was clear that the team would need a lot of effort and luck if it wanted to get its traditional silver or bronze.

In the 2015 season, Sūduva started with a new head coach – Aleksandr Veselinovič. The new coach totally changed the team style from defending to attacking. In the last season game against Atlantas Sūduva needed at least a draw. Sūduva conceded a goal in the 86th minute and lost 3rd place to Atlantas.

At the beginning of the 2016 season, Sūduva recalled former team players Marius Činikas and Martynas Matuzas. Multiple A Lyga champions Algis Jankauskas, Andro Švrljuga and Paulius Janušauskas were signed as well. Also signed were Croatian goalkeeper Ivan Kardum, Serbian forward Admir Kecap, Bosnian-Herzegovinian defensive midfielder Nermin Jamak and Serbian midfielder Predrag Pavlović. Sūduva finished season 3rd, also played in the Cup final the same year.

In 2017, FK Sūduva became the first Lithuanian football club after Žalgiris Vilnius and FK Ekranas to pass three qualifying rounds in European competition in the 2017–18 Europa League.
FK Sūduva eliminated Shakhtyor Soligorsk , FK Liepāja and FC Sion.

In the same season, for the first time, FK Sūduva won the A Lyga.

In 2018, FK Sūduva played in the 2018–19 UEFA Champions League. In the first round, Sūduva advanced over APOEL FC by scoring 3 consecutive goals in the first 18 minutes of play. In the second qualification round they lost to Red Star Belgrade. After that, they had a chance to play in the 2018–19 UEFA Europa League. They won against FK Spartaks Jūrmala in 3Q, but lost to Celtic Glasgow in the play-off stage. In the same season, Sūduva won the A Lyga the second time in a row.

In the 2019 season, the club won the A Lyga, LFF Cup and the Supercup. Despite the success, the club's main sponsors, ARVI Group announced on 11 December 2019 that it will no longer sponsor the Sūduva club. The ARVI Arena, the main football ground named after the sponsor, had the sponsor signboards removed and the stadium was renamed to Marijampolė Football Arena (at least temporarily until another sponsor appears). At the end of the season, Kazakh head coach Vladimir Cheburin announced his intentions to return to Kazakhstan, and did not renew his contract. Cheburin was attributed to a lot of club's success over the past 3 seasons.

In January 2020, Heimo Pfeifenberger became the new head coach, however amidst COVID-19 pandemic, Heimo's and the club's views on player salaries and remote training have become different, and on 14 April the club terminated the contract.

Supporters
FK Sūduva supporters are called "Sūduvos Sakalai" (eng. Falcons of Sūduva).

Kit
Traditional home kit are white colour with red signs.

Away kits are usually red. Shirts, shorts and socks. With white signs.

Goalkeepers kit was yellow colour with black signs and details (in 2018). In the 2019 season kits is light green (or black in alternative).

Joma is a kit sponsor since the 2014 season.

Kit manufacturers and shirt sponsors

Stadium

In 2008, Sūduva moved to a new stadium in Marijampolė, the Marijampolės futbolo arena with a capacity of approximately 6,250 spectators. The stadium was built using funds from the European Union and opened on 6 July 2008. Beginning from the 2011 season, the stadium was named ARVI Football Arena after the sponsoring rights were bought by ARVI Enterprises Group. Near the arena you can find the roof-covered football field Marijampolė Football Indoor Arena, containing 2500 seats. There football can be played all year. There are two outdoor football fields near the arena as well.

Honours

Lithuanian Championship:
A Lyga
1st place (3): 2017, 2018, 2019
2nd place (4): 2007, 2010, 2020, 2021
3rd place (5): 2005, 2009, 2011, 2012, 2016
Lithuanian Cup
Winners (3): 2006, 2008–09, 2019
Runners-up (4): 1976, 2002, 2016, 2020
Lithuanian Supercup
Winners (4): 2009, 2018, 2019, 2022
Runners-up (2): 2007, 2020

Soviet Championship:

Lithuanian SSR Championship
3rd place (1): 1975

Continental
Baltic League* 
Runners-up (1): 2009–10

Current squad

 (on loan from FK Žalgiris)

 (on loan from Kauno Žalgiris)

 (on loan from FK Žalgiris)

Out on loan

Notable players
Players who have either appeared for their respective national team at any time or received an individual award while at the club. 
Players whose name is listed in bold represented their countries while playing for FK Sūduva.

Lithuania
 Džiugas Bartkus
 Ričardas Beniušis
 Valdemar Borovskij
 Karolis Chvedukas
 Artūras Fomenka
 Dominykas Galkevičius
 Darius Gvildys
 Algis Jankauskas
 Tadas Kijanskas
 Povilas Lukšys
 Darius Maciulevičius
 Tomas Mikuckis
 Povilas Leimonas
 Vytautas Andriuškevičius

 Ramūnas Radavičius
 Tomas Radzinevičius
 Nerijus Radžius
 Tomas Ražanauskas
 Mantas Samusiovas
 Vaidas Slavickas
 Nerijus Valskis
 Ovidijus Verbickas
 Irmantas Zelmikas
 Karolis Laukžemis
 Paulius Golubickas
 Markas Beneta

Europe
 Andro Švrljuga
 Daniel Offenbacher
 Ivans Lukjanovs
 Semir Kerla
 Vital Hayduchyk
 Predrag Pavlović

South America
 Gerson Acevedo
 Rafael Gaúcho
 Willer Souza Oliveira

CONCACAF
 Tosaint Ricketts
 Sandro Grande
 Rigino Cicilia
 Jeremy de Nooijer
 Radanfah Abu Bakr

Africa
 Sérgio Semedo
 Henri Junior Ndong
 Eugene Sseppuya

Asia
 Keisuke Honda

Sūduva B
Sūduva B team play in Second league (Southern Zone) since 2016. In 2019 season was in 13th position from 13 teams.

Technical staff

Seasons

Participation in Europe cups 

Accurate as of August 26, 2020

Source: UEFA.comPld = Matches played; W = Matches won; D = Matches drawn; L = Matches lost; GF = Goals for; GA = Goals against; GD = Goal Difference. Defunct competitions indicated in italics.

Individual awards

Domestic

A Lyga top scorers

A Lyga Player of the Year

Lithuanian SSR Championship top scorers

Fk Suduva "Player of the Year"
Lists of the winners of Sūduva Marijampolė Player of the Year Award instituted from 2008 as voted by fans:

 2008:  Darius Maciulevičius
 2009:  Ramūnas Radavičius
 2010:  Vaidas Slavickas
 2011:  Vaidas Slavickas
 2012:  Rafael Ledesma
 2013:  Nerijus Valskis
 2014:  Džiugas Bartkus
 2015:  Tomas Radzinevičius

Managers
 Jonas Kaupaitis (1968–73)
 Mantas Valukonis (1991)
 Saulius Stankūnas (1991–03)
 Algimantas Gabrys (2003 – 31 December 2003)
 Valdemaras Žilinskas (2004)
 Rino Lavezzini (2004 – 2 May 2005)
 Algimantas Gabrys (10 May 2005 – 20 April 2008)
 Igoris Pankratjevas (2008)
 Gediminas Jarmalavičius (2008–09)
 Donatas Vencevičius (29 January 2010 – 19 November 2010)
 Virginijus Liubšys (17 April 2010 – 6 July 2012)
 Darius Gvildys (9 July 2012 – Sept 2014)
 Aleksandar Veselinović (21 December 2014 – 31 August 2016)
 Vladimir Cheburin (8 September 2016 – 22 December 2019)
 Heimo Pfeifenberger (8 January 2020 - 14 April 2020)
 Saulius Širmelis (23 May 2020 - end of the season)
 Víctor Basadre (January 2021 – 4 April 2022)
 Eivinas Černiauskas (4 April 2022 - 11 April 2022)
 Miguel Moreira (11 April 2022 – 20 October 2022)

References

External links
 Official website
 Official Facebook
 alyga.lt official page
 Soccerway

 
Football clubs in Lithuania
1921 establishments in Lithuania
Sport in Marijampolė